This is a outline of topics related to the Caribbean region. Links to outlines and indexes of countries in the Caribbean region are also provided.  The Caribbean (also ; ;) is a region of the Americas that comprises the Caribbean Sea, its surrounding coasts, and its islands (some of which lie within the Caribbean Sea and some of which lie on the edge of the Caribbean Sea where it borders the North Atlantic Ocean). The region lies southeast of the Gulf of Mexico and of the North American mainland, east of Central America, and north of South America.

Caribbean topic outline

History
History of the Caribbean and West Indies:
 Spanish Caribbean (1492–1898)
 Piracy in the Caribbean (1500s–1830)
 Dutch Caribbean (1554–1863)
 British Caribbean (1586–1834)
 French Caribbean (1625–1817)
 Baltic-German Caribbean (1654-1689)
 Danish Caribbean (1672–1917)
 German Caribbean (1685-1693)
 Swedish Caribbean (1784–1878)
 History of the British West Indies
 Amelioration Act 1798
 Bishoprics, etc., in West Indies Act 1842
 British West Indian labour unrest of 1934–1939
 Battle of the Caribbean (1941-1945, World War II)

Historic topics:
 Afro-Caribbean
 Atlantic triangular slave-trade
 Caribbean Court of Justice
 Emancipation of the British West Indies
 Enslavement
 Energy and Climate Partnership of the Americas
 German interest in the Caribbean
 Good Neighbor policy
 Impact of hurricanes on Caribbean history
 Influx of diseases
 Malaria
 COVID-19
 Monroe Doctrine
 Partnership for Prosperity and Security in the Caribbean
 Pre-Columbian trans-oceanic contact theories
 Territorial evolution
 Third Border Initiative
 West Indian Brigade
 West India Regiment

Geography and Geology
Geography and Geology
 Antilles
 Greater Antilles
 Lesser Antilles
 Leeward Islands
 British Leeward Islands
 Leeward Antilles
 Windward Islands
 Caribbean Basin
 Caribbean Lowlands
 Caribbean Plate
 Caribbean Sea
 Caribbean South America
 Gulf of Honduras
 Latin America and the Caribbean
 Southern Caribbean
 Western Caribbean zone

Geographic and geologic topics:
 Bioregion
Caribbean Initiative
 Mammals
 Caribbean monk seal
 List of bats of the Caribbean by island
 List of eulipotyphlans of the Caribbean
 Pilosans of the Caribbean
 Rodents of the Caribbean
 Sealife
 Caribbean hermit crab
 Caribbean Queen Conch
 Caribbean reef octopus
 Caribbean reef shark
 Caribbean sculptured sea catfish
 West Indian manatee
 Trees
 Caribbean pine
 Caribbean large igneous province
 Earthquakes
 Extreme points
 Islands (by area)
 Metropolitan areas
 Mountains
 Rivers
 Ultras
 Sovereign states
 Dependent territories
 World Heritage Sites

Politics
Politics of the Caribbean region:
 Afro-Caribbean leftism
 Association of Caribbean States
 Caribbean Community
 Caribbean Legion
 CARIFORUM
 Coat of arms of the British Windward Islands
 Foreign relations
 Canada–Caribbean relations
 Caribbean–China relations
 Organisation of African, Caribbean and Pacific States
 Organisation of Eastern Caribbean States
 Pan-Caribbean Congress
 West Indies Federation
West Indies Associated States
 Governor-General of the West Indies Federation
West Indies Democratic Labour Party
Democratic Labour Party (West Indies Federation)
West Indies Federal Labour Party

Economy
Economy of the Caribbean:
 Airlines
 Caribbean Airline Pilots Association
 Airports
 Anchor coinage
 Caribbean Basin Trade and Partnership Act
 Caribbean Basin Initiative
 Caribbean Basin Trade and Partnership Act
 Caribbean Basin Trade Partnership Act
 Caribbean Regional Maritime Agreement
 Currencies of the British West Indies
 British West Indies dollar
 Caribbean Broadcasting Corporation (Barbados)
 Caribbean Cinemas 
 Caribbean Development Bank
 Caribbean Free Trade Association
 Central banks and currencies
 Citrus industry
 Companies
 Fishing industry
 Grog
 Latin American and Caribbean Economic Association
 Hotels in the Caribbean
Postage stamps and postal history of the Leeward Islands
 Rum producers
 Stock exchanges in the Americas
 Eastern Caribbean Securities Exchange
 Sugar plantations
 Cuban sugar economy
 Sugar production in the Danish West Indies
 Tourism
 Caribbean Tourism Organization

Demographics
Demographics of the Caribbean
 Languages
Dutch
English
French
Hindustani
Spanish
Other
Pre-Arawakan
 List of populated places in the Caribbean
 Countries by population
 Religions

Culture
Culture of the Caribbean:
 Actors
 Architecture
 Antonin Nechodoma (Prairie style)
 Art
 Art schools
 The Caribbean Artists Movement
 Caribbean Festival of Arts
 English Caribbean arts
 Dutch Caribbean arts
 French Caribbean arts
 Spanish-Caribbean Arts
 Artists
 Caribbean people
 Afro-Caribbean people
 Asian Caribbean
 British African-Caribbean people
 British Indo-Caribbean people
 Caribbean Brazilians
 Caribbean region of Colombia
 Creole people of the Caribbean
 Eastern Caribbean people
 Indo-Caribbean
 West Indian
 White Caribbean
 Women in the Caribbean
 Carnivals
Crafts
 Paper craft
 Periagua (dugout)
 Cuisine
 Beer
 Jerk (cooking)
 Pelau
 Rice and peas
 Rum
 Rum cake
 Dancers
 Ring shout
 Feminism in the Caribbean
 Caribbean Association for Feminist Research and Action
 Film
 Cinema of the Caribbean
 List of Caribbean films
 Literature
 Caribbean folklore
 Caribbean Voices
 Small Axe Project
 Music
 Calypso music
 Concert Halls
 Folk music
 Lesser Antilles music
 Musicians
 Painting
 Picong (banter)
 Poetry
 Quadrille dress
 Radio stations
 Scout Jamboree
 Sculptors
 Sport 
 British West Indies at the 1960 Summer Olympics
 Caribbean Football Union
 Central American and Caribbean Games
 Central American and Caribbean Junior Championships in Athletics
 Cricket in the West Indies
 West Indian cricket team
 West Indies women's cricket team
 West Indies national football team
 West Indies national rugby league team
 Stadiums
 Television stations
 Caribbean's Next Top Model
 ESPN Caribbean
 Tempo Networks
 Theatre
 Universities and educational associations
 Association of Caribbean University, Research and Institutional Libraries
 American University of the Caribbean (Sint Maarten)
 Caribbean Philosophical Association
 Caribbean University (Puerto Rico)
 International University of the Caribbean
 Medical schools
 Caribbean Medical University
 University of the Southern Caribbean (Trinidad and Tobago)
 University of the West Indies

Indigenous peoples of the Caribbean

Indigenous peoples:
 List of Caribbean indigenous peoples
 Taíno (Indigenous peoples of the Bahamas)
 List of Taínos
 Taino archaeology
 Arawak
 Arawakan languages
 Kalinago (Carib people)
 Indigenous Caribbean Visual Arts
 Indigenous Caribbean people
 Indigenous peoples of the Americas
 Indigenous Names of the Eastern Caribbean islands

Related topics
Other general topics about or relating to the Caribbean not included above:

Caribbean South America (Colombia,  Venezuela, and the Guiannas)
Bocas del Toro Creole (Panama)
European colonization of the Americas
Exploration by Christopher Columbus
First wave of European colonization
History of colonialism
Miskito Coastal Creole (Nicaraugua)
San Andrés-Providencia Creole (Colombia)
Territories of the United States (including those in the Caribbean)
United Nations Economic Commission for Latin America and the Caribbean

Countries and territories in the Caribbean region

Continental nations surrounding the Caribbean Sea include:

See also

 :fr:Caraïbes
 :es:Caribe (región)

Anglo-America
Latin American culture
Latin America
Index of Central America-related articles
Lists of country-related topics
Outline of North America
Outline of South America

References

Caribbean
Wikipedia outlines